Abacopteris is a small genus of ferns in the family Thelypteridaceae.

Taxonomy
Abacopteris was previously sunk into Pronephrium but was restored as a full genus as a result of a phylogenetic study of the family Thelypteridaceae.

Species
, World Ferns accepted the following species:
Abacopteris afra (Christ) comb.ined.
Abacopteris aspera (C.Presl) Ching
Abacopteris birii (R.D.Dixit & Balkr.) S.E.Fawc. & A.R.Sm.
Abacopteris gardneri (Holttum) S.E.Fawc. & A.R.Sm.
Abacopteris gracilis (Ching ex Y.X.Lin) S.E.Fawc. & A.R.Sm.
Abacopteris gymnopteridifrons (Hayata) Ching
Abacopteris hirtisora (C.Chr.) S.E.Fawc. & A.R.Sm.
Abacopteris macrophylla (Ching ex Y.X.Lin) S.E.Fawc. & A.R.Sm.
Abacopteris nitida (Holttum) S.E.Fawc. & A.R.Sm.
Abacopteris nudata (Roxb.) S.E.Fawc. & A.R.Sm.
Abacopteris peltochlamys (C.Chr.) Holttum
Abacopteris repanda (Fee) S.E.Fawc. & A.R.Sm.
Abacopteris setosa (Ching ex Y.X.Lin) S.E.Fawc. & A.R.Sm.
Abacopteris yunguiensis (Ching ex Y.X.Lin) S.E.Fawc. & A.R.Sm.

References

Thelypteridaceae
Fern genera